Youmian are a variety of Chinese noodle widely used in Southern China, especially in the cuisines of Hong Kong and Guangdong. It has also been selectively used in the dishes of Shanghai, Malaysia, and Singapore. Youmian is also used in some dishes in the overseas Chinese communities.

Description
Thin noodles are generally made with eggs.

One well known variety of thin noodles is called  (Cantonese; translating roughly as "whole egg noodles"). This variety is almost exclusively found in East and Southeast Asia, in regions with sizable Chinese populations.

Use in dishes

Preparation
Depending on the cuisine style, thin noodles may be boiled with some type of broth or stir fried in a wok.

List of use in dishes

Cantonese cuisine
 Wonton noodle
 Lo mein
 Beef ball noodle
 Fish ball noodle
 Fish slice noodle

See also
 Chinese noodles
 Oil noodles
 Saang mein

Chinese noodles
Cantonese cuisine
Hong Kong cuisine